The 2018 New Zealand National Party leadership election was held on 27 February 2018 to determine the 12th Leader of the National Party. On 13 February 2018, Bill English announced his resignation as leader of the National Party, effective on 27 February 2018. He left Parliament on 13 March 2018. On 20 February, Deputy Leader Paula Bennett announced that a concurrent deputy leadership election would take place, in which she would stand.

After a secret caucus ballot Simon Bridges was declared the new leader of the National Party and Paula Bennett was re-elected as deputy.

Background
The Fifth National Government of New Zealand came to an end after the 2017 general election saw the National Party win 44% of the vote and Labour and New Zealand First form the minority Sixth Labour Government with confidence and supply from the Green Party. On 13 February 2018 Bill English, the leader of the National Party and Prime Minister from 2016 to 2017, announced his resignation as party leader effective on 27 February, and as a Member of Parliament effective on 13 March. Deputy leader Paula Bennett asked National senior whip Jami-Lee Ross for her role to also be put up for election, but she would run to keep the position. No other candidate declared an intention to run for the deputy leadership before 27 February.

Candidates

Declared candidates 

At the time of the election, the following individuals were candidates:

Withdrew before vote

Declined

The following individuals were speculated as being possible leadership candidates, but ruled out a bid:
Maggie Barry, MP for North Shore since 2011
Paula Bennett, MP for Upper Harbour since 2014, Deputy Leader of the National Party
Jonathan Coleman, MP for Northcote since 2005
Nathan Guy, MP for Ōtaki since 2005
Nikki Kaye, MP for Auckland Central since 2008
Todd McClay, MP for Rotorua since 2008
Todd Muller, MP for Bay of Plenty since 2014

Public opinion polling

Result
The election was conducted as a secret ballot of the National Party parliamentary caucus. An exhaustive ballot method was used, so that the support of 29 of the 56 MPs were required to elect the leader. Bridges was elected party leader after two rounds of voting. Bennett and Collins ran for the deputy leadership, and Bennett was re-elected to the position.

Outcomes

On 6 March Joyce announced his retirement from politics following speculation he would lose the finance portfolio. Joyce wouldn't confirm or deny this but said Bridges offered him a "high-ranking" portfolio. On 11 March Bridges announced his shadow cabinet which saw Adams, Collins and Mitchell receive promotions; ranked 3rd, 4th and 7th respectively. Two weeks later, former leadership contender Jonathan Coleman resigned from Parliament; Adams announced her own upcoming retirement in early 2019.

Bridges held the leadership for two years, before being successfully challenged for the role by Todd Muller.

See also
 2018 Green Party of Aotearoa New Zealand female co-leadership election
 52nd New Zealand Parliament

References

2018 elections in New Zealand
2018
February 2018 events in New Zealand
New Zealand National Party leadership election